Den Helder Zuid railway station (English: Den Helder South) serves the town of Den Helder, Netherlands. The station opened on 31 May 1980 and is located on the Den Helder–Amsterdam railway. The train services are operated by Nederlandse Spoorwegen. The station has two platforms, of which only one is in use for both directions.

Train services
The station is served by the following service(s):

2x per hour Intercity services Den Helder - Amsterdam - Utrecht - Arnhem - Nijmegen

Bus services
These services stop outside the station. For timetables see.

References

External links
NS website
Dutch public transport travel planner
Departure times for Den Helder South

Railway stations in North Holland
Railway stations opened in 1980
Railway stations on the Staatslijn K